The Asia Minor spiny mouse (Acomys cilicicus) is a species of rodent in the family Muridae.

Description
Acomys cilicicus is a small terrestrial and social rodent, living in large groups.

The upper side of the body is dark gray, with purple reflections, while the lower sides are yellowish-white and the flanks are light brown. The tail is hairless, scaly and shorter than the head and body. The chromosome number is 2n = 36.

In captivity, these mice reproduce and live for about four years. Since this species was previously considered endangered, a protection program is in place and government permission is needed for export from Turkey. Only a few zoos in the world have individuals of this species (Chester, Riga, Prague, Tallinn and Helsinki Zoo).

This species is related to the Cairo spiny mouse (Acomys cahirinus) and the Cyprus spiny mouse (Acomys nesiotes), but significant morphological differences are seen.

Distribution 
This species is endemic to Turkey. It is known only from the type locality 17 km east of the Turkish town of Silifke, located in the south-west of Mersin, along the southern coast of Turkey.

Habitat
Its natural habitat is temperate forests, but this species is also lives close to human dwellings.

Conservation status
A. cilicicus was previously listed as Critically Endangered, but is now considered Data Deficient because of taxonomic issues, as it may be the same species as the widespread and common northeast Cairo spiny mouse, A. cahirinus.

References

External links
Mammals species of the World
 
 
 

Acomys
Fauna of Turkey
Endemic fauna of Turkey
Mammals described in 1978
Taxonomy articles created by Polbot